The Rodriguez-Avero-Sanchez House is a historic home in St. Augustine, Florida. It is located at 52 St. George Street. It was built in 1762. On April 16, 1971, it was added to the U.S. National Register of Historic Places.

References

External links

Florida's Office of Cultural and Historical Programs
St. Johns County listings at Florida's Office of Cultural and Historical Programs
Rodriguez-Avero-Sanchez House

Gallery

Houses on the National Register of Historic Places in Florida
National Register of Historic Places in St. Johns County, Florida
Buildings and structures in St. Augustine, Florida
Houses in St. Johns County, Florida
Historic American Buildings Survey in Florida
Houses completed in 1762
1762 establishments in North America